Super Girls, stylized as SUPER☆GiRLS, also known as  are an eleven-member Japanese idol group. Formed by Avex Trax in 2010 after various auditions, the current group includes new members. They have released several albums.

History
Avex held public auditions for members of the new group in June 2010, from which twelve finalists were selected out of 7,000 participants. By February 2010, about 1,000 people advanced to the second round, and a final round was held in June. The results of the audition were subject to controversy because of a lottery system used to select two of the members. Super Girls made their stage debut on 7 August 2010 at the A-Nation event. The first live performance of the 11-member idol group was held at Shiodome-AX in Tokyo, and the group released their first album, on 22 December 2010. The group held their first live concert on 23 October at Harajuku Astro Hall in Tokyo.

Two more singles followed in 2011, "Max! Otomegokoro/Happy Go Lucky!" and "Joshiryoku Paradise". At the end of the year, they were nominated for the Japan Record Award for Best New Artist but lost to another girl group, Fairies.

On 1 February 2012, group released their second album, Everybody JUMP!!. 
Eri Akita graduated from the group on 5 February, it was the first graduation from the group.
Three more singles released in 2012, "1,000,000 ☆ Smile", "Puri Puri♥SUMMER Kiss", and "Red Passion".

Kaede Kanō retired from the group on 16 January 2013. 
The group released their third album, "Celebration" on 20 February 2013, and held the 3rd anniversary live concert on 11 June 2013 at Nippon Budokan. 
Four more singles released in 2013, "Everlasting Summer High Touch", "Younger Boy", "Sentimental Journey", and "Jin Jin Jingle Bell".

The 9th single "Sky-Colored Miracle" released on 12 February 2014.
On 23 February 2014, first leader Saori Yasaka graduated from the group and Rika Shimura become a second leader. Also Nana Asakawa, Risa Uchimura, and Koume Watanabe are joined the group at the same day, and the "Chapter-2" of the group has started.
Two more singles released in 2014, "The Flower Road!! A~mbitious", and "Ahhahha! ~Music of Transcending Laughs~".

On 18 February 2015, the group released their 18th single "Sparking Revolution", Aya Goto graduated from the group on 31 March 2015.
Between July to September, they held the free concert tour "iDOL Street 5th Anniversary ~Trip cutting across JAPAN~".
One more single released in 2015, "Come Go♪ Do It♪" on August.

On 9 March 2016, the group released their fourth album Super Castle, the first album while the chapter 2.
Rino Katsuta and Reira Arai graduated from the group on 25 June 2016 and the chapter 2 was ended. Sakurako Kidoguchi, Hotaru Ishibashi, Runa Ozawa, Yumeri Abe, and Shiori Nagao joined the group at the same day, the leader of the group was changed to Ami Maeshima, and the "Chapter-3" of the group has started.
Two singles released in 2016, "Love Summer!!!" and "Love☆Sparkling Application!!!".

Ami Maeshima graduated from the group on 31 March 2017. The leader changed to Ruka Mizote, which reported at the 7th Anniversary Live concert on 17 June 2017.
The 16th single "Sweet☆Smile" released on 26 April 2016. Sakurako Kidoguchi graduated from the group on 30 September 2016, after the hiatus period since 17 April.
One more single "A Cinderella Story of Sweat and Tears" released in November 2016.

Runa Ozawa graduated from the group on 31 January 2017, Mirei Tanaka graduated on 31 March.
The group released 18th single "Sparklingly☆Sunshine" on 2 May 2017, the last release to Rika Shimura which graduated on 20 May.
The public auditions "SUPER☆GiRLS SUPER AUDITION!!!!" started on 1 July 2018 to select the new members. Entries were accepted at three medias, "SHOWROOM", "MBS Radio", and "FRESH LIVE".

The 19th single "Bubbling Squash!" released on August. Then 20th single "The Selfish GiRLS ROAD" released on November, which becomes the last single of the chapter 3.

On 19 December 2018, The debut 8th Anniversary live concert held at "Shibuya O-East". The new members Yuuki Kanazawa, Chika Ishimaru, Kana Sakabayashi, Mayuko Inoue, Yuu Kadobayashi, Nazuna Higuchi, and Aika Matsumoto joined the group. Koume Watanabe became the 5th leader of the group, and the "Chapter 4" started.

On 11 January 2019, Hikaru Watanabe, Rina Miyazaki, Ruka Mizote, Nana Asakawa, and Risa Uchimura graduated from the group at the live concert, and the chapter 3 period officially ends. Three singles released in 2020, "CongraCHUlations!!!", "Summer★Vacation", and "Cinderella of Unrequited Love". The fifth album "Chōzetsu☆Gakuen ~Tokimeki High Range!!!~" was released on 25 December 2019. Hotaru Ishibashi graduated from the group on 31 December 2019, after the hiatus period since 4 September 2019.

On 18 March 2020, the 24th single "Forgotten Cherry Blossoms" was released. The tenth Anniversary live concert planned for 11 June 2020, was canceled due to COVID-19. The 25th single "I Want To Believe In Tomorrow" was released on 5 August 2020, and the album Chōzetsu Shōjo☆COMPLETE 2010～2020 was released on 23 December 2020. Chika Ishimaru graduated from the group on 31 December 2020, bringing the count of group members to nine.

SUPER GiRLS released their 25th single Hajimari Yell on 21 April. This is the first single without Ishimaru Chika and also the last single of the chapter 4.

On 12 June, Watanabe Koume and Matsumoto Aika graduated from the group and 3 new members were introduced, They are Hagita Honoka, Takeuchi Nanami and Tanaka Cocona. It was also announced that Yumeri became the 6th leader of Super Girls, they also released their 26th single WELCOME☆Natsuzora Peace!!!!! on 25 August, which was the debut of the new-line up and the "Chapter 5" started. Mayuko Inoue graduated from the group on 30 December 2021, after the hiatus period since 6 August 2021.

On April 18, it was announced that SUPER☆GiRLS would release their 27th single Summer Lemon on 6 July, marking nearly ten months since their previous release. This will be the first single with their nine-member lineup without Inoue Mayuko.

On June 11, Nagao Shiori, Kanazawa Yuuki and Higuchi Nazuna announced that they would graduate from SUPER☆GiRLS and IDOL Street on 31 December 2022, which later postponed to 10 February 2023 because of the COVID-19 pandemic.

On June 12, Yumeri Abe announced she would take a hiatus due to heath problems. She later recovered on July 23 and restarted activities.

On 25 July, Nanami Takeuchi announced she would take a hiatus from August 21, 2022 to March 1, 2023 in order to concentrate on her studies when she takes the university entrance exam.

On 29 January, During the SUPER☆GiRLS 12th Anniversary Concert, 5 new members were introduced, They are Ayaka Kamata, Ayana Kashiwa, Kaho Kawamura, Hinata Sakurai and Karen Habuchi, and the "Chapter 6" started. Shiori Nagao, Yuuki Kanazawa and Nazuna Higuchi graduated from the group on 15 February 2023, bringing the count of group members to eleven.

On March 1, Nanami Takeuchi began to restart her activities.

Members

Current members

Former members
Eri Akita（秋田 恵里）
Kaede Kanō（稼農 楓）
Saori Yasaka（八坂 沙織）
Aya Gotō（後藤 彩）
Rino Katsuta（勝田 梨乃）
Reira Arai（荒井 玲良）
Ami Maeshima（前島亜美）
Sakurako Kidoguchi（木戸口桜子）
Runa Ozawa（尾澤ルナ）
Mirei Tanaka（田中美麗）
Rika Shimura（志村 理佳）
Hikaru Watanabe（渡邉 ひかる）
Rina Miyazaki（宮﨑 理奈）
Ruka Mizote（溝手るか）
Nana Asakawa（浅川 梨奈）
Risa Uchimura（内村莉彩）
Hotaru Ishibashi（石橋蛍）
Chika Ishimaru（石丸千賀）
Koume Watanabe（渡邉幸愛）
Aika Matsumoto（松本愛花）
Mayuko Inoue（井上真由子）
Shiori Nagao（長尾しおり）
Yuuki Kanazawa（金澤有希）
Nazuna Higuchi（樋口なづな）

Timeline

Discography

Albums

Singles

Music Cards

DVDs

Awards

Japan Record Awards

The Japan Record Awards is a music awards show held annually by the Japan Composer's Association.

|-
|rowspan=2| 2011
|rowspan=2 align="center"| Super Girls (group)
| New Artist
| 
|-
| Best New Artist
|

References

External links
  

Avex Group artists
Japanese girl groups
Japanese idol groups
Japanese-language singers
Musical groups established in 2010
Japanese pop music groups
2010 establishments in Japan
Musical groups from Tokyo